Paul Zgheib (born 1959) is a Lebanese photographer.

Zgheib is originally from Byblos, Lebanon.

He studied photography at the French School of Visual Communications (EFET) in Paris. Considered one of the leading photographers in Lebanon and the Levant, Zgheib currently teaches photography at the Université Saint-Esprit de Kaslik.

External links
Article on and photographs by Paul Zgheib

Lebanese photographers
1959 births
Living people
Date of birth missing (living people)